"Guardando il cielo" is a song by Italian singer Arisa. It was written by Giuseppe Anastasi and produced by Nicolò Fragile and Giuseppe Barbera.

It was released by Warner Music Italy on 10 February 2016 as the lead single from her fifth studio album Guardando il cielo. The song was Arisa's entry for the Sanremo Music Festival 2016, where it placed tenth in the grand final.

Music video
The music video of "Guardando il cielo" was directed by Gaetano Morbioli and released onto YouTube on 9 February 2016. The video was shot in London.

Track listing

Charts

Certifications

References

2010s ballads
2016 singles
2016 songs
Arisa songs
Folk ballads
Italian-language songs
Sanremo Music Festival songs
Songs written by Giuseppe Anastasi
Warner Music Group singles